The Magersfontein battlefield is a site of the Battle of Magersfontein (11 December 1899), part of the Second Boer War in South Africa.

Footnotes

Geography of the Northern Cape
Kimberley, Northern Cape
Military and war museums in South Africa
Karoo
Museums in the Northern Cape